The men's 3000 metres steeplechase event at the 1978 Commonwealth Games was held on 6 and 7 August at the Commonwealth Stadium in Edmonton, Alberta, Canada.

Medalists

Results

Heats
Held on 6 August

Qualification: First 5 in each heat (Q) and the next 2 fastest (q) qualify for the final.

Final
Held on 7 August

References

Heats results (The Canberra Times)
Final results (The Canberra Times)
Australian results

Athletics at the 1978 Commonwealth Games
1978